Vayetze, Vayeitzei, or Vayetzei (—Hebrew for 'and he left', the first word in the parashah) is the seventh weekly Torah portion in the annual Jewish cycle of Torah reading. It constitutes . The parashah tells of Jacob's travels to, life in, and return from Harran. The parashah recounts Jacob's dream of a ladder to heaven, Jacob's meeting of Rachel at the well, Jacob's time working for Laban and living with Rachel and Leah, the birth of Jacob's children, and the departure of Jacob's family from Laban.

The parashah is made up of 7,512 Hebrew letters, 2,021 Hebrew words, 148 verses, and 235 lines in a Torah Scroll (Sefer Torah). Jews read it the seventh Sabbath after Simchat Torah, generally in November or December.

Readings
In the Masoretic Text of the Tanakh (Hebrew Bible), Parashah Vayetze is unusual in that it is entirely contained in one single "open portion" (roughly equivalent to a paragraph, often abbreviated with the Hebrew letter  (peh)). And within that single open portion, Parashah Vayetze does not have any "closed portion" divisions (abbreviated with the Hebrew letter  (samekh)).

First reading—Genesis 28:10–22
In the first reading, when Jacob left Beersheba for Haran, he stopped at a place for the night, using a stone for a pillow. He dreamed that he saw a ladder to heaven on which God's angels ascended and descended. And God stood beside him and promised to give him and his numerous descendants the land on which he lay, said that through his descendants all the earth would be blessed, and promised to stay with him wherever he went and bring him back to the land. Jacob awoke afraid, remarked that surely the place was the house of God, the gate of heaven, and called the place Bethel (although the Canaanites had called the city Luz). Jacob took the stone from under his head, set it up as a pillar, and poured oil on it. And Jacob vowed that if God would stay with him, give him bread and clothing, and return him to his father's house in peace, then God would be his god, the stone pillar would be God's house, and he would give God a tenth of what he received. The first reading ends here with the end of chapter .

Second reading—Genesis 29:1–17
In the second reading, in chapter , Jacob came to an eastern land where he saw a well with a great stone rolled upon it and three flocks of sheep lying by it. Jacob asked the men where they were from, and they said Haran. Jacob asked them if they knew Laban, and they said that they did. Jacob asked if Laban was well, and they said that he was, and that his daughter Rachel was coming with his sheep. Jacob told the men to water and feed the sheep, but they replied that they could not do so until all the flocks had arrived. When Jacob saw Rachel arrive with her father's sheep, he rolled the stone from the well's mouth, and watered Laban's sheep. Jacob kissed Rachel, wept, and told her that he was her kinsman, and she ran and told her father. When Laban heard of Jacob's arrival, he ran to meet him, embraced and kissed him, and brought him to his house. Jacob told Laban all that had happened, and Laban welcomed Jacob as family. After Jacob had lived with Laban for a month, Laban asked Jacob what wages he wanted for his work. Laban had two daughters: The elder, Leah, had weak eyes, while the younger, Rachel, was beautiful. The second reading ends here.

Third reading—Genesis 29:18–30:13
In the third reading, Jacob loved Rachel and, responding to Laban's enquiry in verse 15, offered to serve Laban seven years for Rachel's hand, to which Laban agreed. Jacob served the years, but his love for Rachel made them seem like just a few days. Jacob asked Laban for his wife, and Laban made a feast and invited all the men of the place. In the evening, Laban brought Leah to Jacob, and Jacob slept with her. Laban gave Leah Zilpah to be her handmaid. In the morning, Jacob discovered that it was Leah, and he complained to Laban that he had served for Rachel. Laban replied that in that place, they did not give the younger before the firstborn, but if Jacob fulfilled Leah's week, he would give Jacob both daughters in exchange for another seven years of service. Jacob did so, and Laban gave him Rachel to wife, and gave Rachel Bilhah to be her handmaid. Jacob loved Rachel more than Leah, so God allowed Leah to conceive, but Rachel was barren. Leah bore a son, and called him Reuben, saying that God had looked upon her affliction. She bore a second son, and called him Simeon, saying that God had heard that she was hated. She bore a third son, and called him Levi, saying that this time her husband would be joined to her. She bore a fourth son, and called him Judah, saying that this time, she would praise God. Rachel envied her sister, and demanded that Jacob give her children, but Jacob grew angry and asked her whether he was in God's stead, who had withheld children from her. Rachel told Jacob to sleep with her maid Bilhah, so that Bilhah might bear children upon Rachel's knees who might be credited to Rachel, and he did. Bilhah bore Jacob a son, and Rachel called him Dan, saying that God had judged her and also heard her voice. And Bilhah bore Jacob a second son, and Rachel called him Naphtali, saying that she had wrestled with her sister and prevailed. When Leah saw that she had stopped bearing, she gave Jacob her maid Zilpah to wife. Zilpah bore Jacob a son, and Leah called him Gad, saying that fortune had come. And Zilpah bore Jacob a second son, and Leah called him Asher, saying that she was happy, for the daughters would call her happy. The third reading ends here.

Fourth reading—Genesis 30:14–27

In the fourth reading, Reuben found some mandrakes and brought them to Leah. Rachel asked Leah for the mandrakes, and when Leah resisted, Rachel agreed that Jacob would sleep with Leah that night in exchange for the mandrakes. When Jacob came home that evening, Leah told him that he had to sleep with her because she had hired him with the mandrakes, and he did. God heeded Leah and she conceived and bore Jacob a fifth son, and called him Issachar, saying that God had given her a reward. Leah bore Jacob a sixth son and called him Zebulun, saying that God had endowed her with a good dowry. And afterwards Leah bore a daughter, and called her name Dinah. God heeded Rachel and she conceived and bore a son and called him Joseph, invoking God to add another son. Then Jacob asked Laban to allow him, his wives, and his children to return to his own country. Laban conceded that God had blessed him for Jacob's sake. The fourth reading ends here.

Fifth reading—Genesis 30:28–31:16
In the fifth reading, Laban asked Jacob to name how much he wanted to stay. Jacob recounted how he had served Laban and how Laban had benefited, and asked when he could provide for his own family. Laban pressed him again, so Jacob offered to keep Laban's flock in exchange for the speckled, spotted, and dark sheep and goats, and thus Laban could clearly tell Jacob's flock from his. Laban agreed, but that day he removed the speckled and spotted goats and dark sheep from his flock and gave them to his sons and put three day's distance between Jacob and himself. Jacob peeled white streaks in fresh rods of poplar, almond, and plane trees and set the rods where the flocks would see them when they mated, and the flocks brought forth streaked, speckled, and spotted young. Jacob laid the rods before the eyes of the stronger sheep, but not before the feeble, so the feebler sheep became Laban's and the stronger Jacob's. Jacob's flocks and wealth thus increased. Jacob heard that Laban's sons thought that he had become wealthy at Laban's expense, and Jacob saw that Laban did not regard him as before. God told Jacob to return to the land of his fathers, and that God would be with him. Jacob called Rachel and Leah to the field and told them that Laban had changed his opinion of Jacob, but Jacob had served Laban wholeheartedly and God had remained with Jacob. Jacob noted that Laban had mocked him and changed his wages ten times, but God would not allow him to harm Jacob, but had rewarded Jacob, giving Laban's animals to Jacob. Jacob said that in a dream God told him to return to the land of his birth. Rachel and Leah answered that they no longer had any portion in Laban's house and all the riches that God had taken from Laban were theirs and their children's, so Jacob should do whatever God had told him to do. The fifth reading ends here.

Sixth reading—Genesis 31:17–42
In the sixth reading, Jacob set his sons and his wives on camels and headed out toward Isaac and Canaan with all the animals and wealth that he had collected in Padan-aram. Jacob tricked Laban by fleeing secretly while Laban was out shearing his sheep, and Rachel stole her father's idols. On the third day, Laban heard that Jacob had fled and he and his kin pursued after Jacob seven days, overtaking him in the mountain of Gilead. God came to Laban in a dream and told him not to speak to Jacob either good or bad. But when Laban caught up with Jacob, he asked Jacob what he meant by carrying away his daughters secretly, like captives, without letting him kiss his daughters and grandchildren goodbye. Laban said that while he had the power to harm Jacob, God had told him the previous night not to speak to Jacob either good or bad, and now Laban wanted to know why Jacob had stolen his gods. Jacob answered that he fled secretly out of fear that Laban might take his daughters by force, and not knowing Rachel stole the gods, he told Laban that whoever had his gods would die. Laban searched Jacob's tent, Leah's tent, and the two maid-servants' tent, finding nothing, and then he entered Rachel's tent. Rachel had hidden the idols in the camel's saddle and sat upon them, apologizing to her father for not rising, as she was having her period. Laban searched and felt about the tent, but did not find the idols. Angered, Jacob questioned Laban what he had done to deserve this hot pursuit and this searching. Jacob protested that he had worked for Laban for twenty years, through drought and frost, bearing the loss of animals torn by predators, and not eating Laban's rams, only to have his wages changed ten times. Had not the God of Isaac been on Jacob's side, surely Laban would have sent Jacob away empty, Jacob said, and God had seen his affliction and awarded him what he deserved. The sixth reading ends here.

Seventh reading—Genesis 31:43–32:3
In the seventh reading, Laban answered Jacob that they were his daughters, his children, and his flocks, but asked what he could do about it now. Instead, Laban proposed that they make a covenant, and Jacob set up a stone pillar and with his kin heaped stones, and they ate a meal by the heap. Laban called it Jegar-sahadutha, but Jacob called it Galeed. Laban called the heap as a witness between him and Jacob, and invoked God to watch, when they were apart, if Jacob would afflict Laban's daughters and take other wives. And Laban designated the heap and the pillar as a boundary between him and Jacob; Laban would not pass over it to Jacob, and Jacob would not pass over it to Laban, to do harm. Laban invoked the God of Abraham, the God of Nahor, and the God of Terah, and Jacob swore by the Fear of Isaac and offered a sacrifice.

In the maftir reading of  that concludes the parashah, early in the morning, Laban kissed his sons and his daughters, blessed them, and departed for his home. And when Jacob went on his way, the angels of God met him, and Jacob told them that this was God's camp, and he called the place Mahanaim. The seventh reading, the single open portion, and the parashah end here.

Readings according to the triennial cycle
Jews who read the Torah according to the triennial cycle of Torah reading read the parashah according to the following schedule:

In inner-biblical interpretation
The parashah has parallels or is discussed in these Biblical sources:

Genesis chapter 28
Whereas the first blessing was one of material wellbeing and dominance, only the second and third blessings conveyed fertility and the Land of Israel. Only the third blessing vouchsafed God's Presence with Jacob.

In , Jacob took the stone on which he had slept, set it up as a pillar and poured oil on the top of it.  would later direct the Israelites to break the Canaanites' pillars into pieces.  would direct the Israelites not to rear up a pillar. And  would prohibit them to set up a pillar "which the Lord your God hates".

Hosea recounted that at Bethel, Jacob met and communed with God.

Genesis chapter 29
Each involves (1) a trip to a distant land, (2) a stop at a well, (3) a young woman coming to the well to draw water, (4) a heroic drawing of water, (5) the young woman going home to report to her family, (6) the visiting man brought to the family, and (7) a subsequent marriage.

Genesis chapter 30
In , God "remembered" Rachel to deliver her from childlessness.

In classical rabbinic interpretation
The parashah is discussed in these rabbinic sources from the era of the Mishnah and the Talmud:

Genesis chapter 28
Rabbi Judan taught in Rabbi Aibu's name that the words, "the righteous comes out of trouble," in  allude to Jacob, as  reports, "And Jacob went out from Beer-sheba" (and away from Esau, who sought to kill him).

A Midrash noted that  reports that Abraham sent Eliezer to woo Rebekah with ten camels and "having all goodly things of his master's in his hand," but Jacob traveled to Haran without a single ring or bracelet. Rabbi Haninah taught that Isaac sent Jacob away empty-handed. Rabbi Joshua, however, taught that Isaac sent Jacob well provided, but Esau arose and stripped him of all he had. The Midrash taught that Jacob then thought to himself that he would not lose confidence in God, for as  teaches, his help would come from God. As  teaches, God would not suffer his foot to be moved and the Midrash taught that this meant that God would not allow Jacob to die. As  teaches, God would keep him from all evil, and thus from the evil Esau and Laban. And  teaches, God would guard his going out, and thus as  reports, "Jacob went out from Beer-sheba."

Hezekiah taught that Jacob was 63 years old when Isaac blessed him (as a Baraita taught), and Jacob spent another 14 years secluded in the Land of Israel studying under Eber and a further seven years working for the Matriarchs. Thus, he married at the age of 84, whereas Esau married at the age of 40 (as  reports). Thus we learn that God hastens the happiness of the wicked and delays that of the righteous.

Rabbi Hoshaya noted that  already stated, "And Jacob hearkened to his father and his mother, and was gone to Paddan-aram," and thus Rabbi Hoshaya asked why  says, "and Jacob went out from Beer-sheba." Rabbi Hoshaya taught that Jacob reasoned that when his father desired to emigrate from the Land of Israel, he first sought permission at Beer-sheba, so Jacob too went to Beer-sheba to seek God's permission.

Rabbi Judan and Rav Huna commented on why  says, "and Jacob went out from Beer-sheba." Rabbi Judan taught that it means that Jacob sought to leave "out of the well of the oath." (means 'well'. Rabbi Judan taught that Jacob reasoned that he did not want Abimelech to demand that Jacob swear to Abimelech (a commitment of nonaggression) as Jacob's grandfather Abraham swore to him, and so delay Jacob's descendants from entering the Land of Israel for seven generations. (As a result of Abraham's oath to Abimelech, seven generations—from Abraham to Joshua—passed before the Israelites entered the Land of Israel. Thus to avoid another seven generations of delay, Jacob went "out of the well of the oath" to evade a further commitment of nonaggression.) Rav Huna taught that the words of  mean "out of the well of the birthright." Rav Huna taught that Jacob reasoned that he did not wish to allow Esau to rise up against him and assert that Jacob had cheated him by taking his birthright, and thus lose the advantage of Esau's oath (when Esau conveyed his birthright in ). Rabbi Berekiah taught that the words of  mean "out of the well of the blessings." Rabbi Berekiah taught that Jacob reasoned that he did not want Esau to rise up against him and assert that Jacob had cheated Jacob by taking Esau's blessings, and so frustrate his mother Rebekah's labors on his behalf.

Our Rabbis taught that Jacob reached Haran on that same day as  reports that he "went toward Haran." Rabbi Berekiah said in Rabbi Isaac's name, however, that  merely speaks as people do colloquially when they say, "So-and-so has gone to Caesarea," when in fact So-and-so has not actually arrived in Caesarea. (Similarly, here  does not mean that Jacob reached Haran on the same day that he set out.)

Rabbi Isaac said that it meant that the sun which had set early for his sake now rose early for him. Rabbi Isaac noted that  reports that Jacob left Beersheba in the south of the Land of Israel and went toward Haran north of the Land, and  reports that "he lighted upon the place" identified (in ) as Bethel in the center of the Land. Rabbi Isaac explained that when he reached Haran, he asked himself how he could have passed through the place where his fathers had prayed and not have prayed there too. So Rabbi Isaac deduced that he immediately resolved to turn back, and as soon he did, the earth contracted and he immediately "lighted upon the place." After he prayed, he sought to return to Haran, but God chose to give this righteous man a night's rest and immediately (as  reports) "the sun was set."

Rav Huna explained that it is because God is the Place of the world (the world is contained in God, and not God in the world). Rabbi Isaac taught that reading , "The eternal God is a dwelling place," one cannot know whether God is the dwelling-place of God's world or whether God's world is God's dwelling-place. But reading , "Lord, You have been our dwelling-place," it follows that God is the dwelling-place of God's world, but God's world is not God's dwelling-place. And Rabbi Abba ben Judan taught that God is like a warrior riding a horse with the warrior's robes flowing over on both sides of the horse. The horse is subsidiary to the rider, but the rider is not subsidiary to the horse. Thus  says, "You ride upon Your horses, upon Your chariots of victory."

The Gemara noted that  reports that "he took of the stones of the place" (in the plural) but  reports that "he took the stone" (in the singular). Rabbi Isaac deduced that all the stones gathered themselves together into the same place so as to be the stone upon which this righteous man would rest his head, and as a Tanna taught in a Baraita, all the stones merged into one.

God showed Jacob a ladder standing from the earth to the heaven, as  says, "And he dreamed, and behold a ladder set up on the earth, and the top of it reached to heaven." The angels who had been on earth ascended to see Jacob's face. Some angels ascended and some descended, as  says, "And behold the angels of God were ascending and descending on it." Rabbi Levi taught that God showed Jacob the four kingdoms, their rule and their destruction. God showed Jacob the prince of the kingdom of Babylon ascending 70 rungs, and descending. God showed Jaocb the prince of the kingdom of Media ascending 52 rungs and descending. God showed Jacob the prince of the kingdom of Greece ascending 180 rungs and descending. And God showed Jacob the prince of the kingdom of Edom (Rome) ascending, and he was not descending, but was saying (in the words of ), "I will ascend above the heights of the clouds; I will be like the Most High." Jacob replied to him (in the words of ): "Yet you shall be brought down to Sheol, to the uttermost parts of the pit." God affirmed that this would be so, even (in the words of ), "though you should make your nest as high as the eagle."

Bar Kappara taught that every dream has its interpretation. The "ladder" in  symbolizes the stairway leading up to the altar in the Temple in Jerusalem. "And the top of it reached to heaven" implies the sacrifices, the odor of which ascended to heaven. "The angels of God" symbolize the High Priests. "Ascending and descending on it" describes the priests ascending and descending the stairway of the altar.

The "ladder" symbolizes Mount Sinai. "And behold the angels of God" alludes to Moses and Aaron. "Ascending" parallels  "And Moses went up to God." "And descending" parallels  "And Moses went down from the mount." And the words "and, behold, the Lord stood beside him" in  parallel the words of  "And the Lord came down upon Mount Sinai."

The Tanna noted that  reports "the angels of God ascending and descending on it," and thus deduced from the plural that at least two angels were ascending and two descending, and when they came to the same place on the ladder, there were four angels abreast. And  reports of an angel that "His body was like the Tarshish," and by tradition the sea of Tarshish is 2,000 parasangs long.

 reports that Jacob "had a dream." And  reports that "God appeared to Laban the Aramean in a dream by night." The Gemara taught that a dream is a sixtieth part of prophecy. Rabbi Hanan taught that even if the Master of Dreams (an angel, in a dream that truly foretells the future) tells a person that on the next day the person will die, the person should not desist from prayer, for as  says, "For in the multitude of dreams are vanities and also many words, but fear God." (Although a dream may seem reliably to predict the future, it will not necessarily come true; one must place one's trust in God.) Rabbi Samuel bar Nahmani said in the name of Rabbi Jonathan that a person is shown in a dream only what is suggested by the person's own thoughts (while awake), as  says, "As for you, Oh King, your thoughts came into your mind upon your bed," and  says, "That you may know the thoughts of the heart." When Samuel had a bad dream, he used to quote , "The dreams speak falsely." The Gemara resolved the contradiction, teaching that , "I speak with him in a dream?" refers to dreams that come through an angel, whereas , "The dreams speak falsely," refers to dreams that come through a demon.

A Midrash taught that those angels who escort a person in the Land of Israel do not escort that person outside of the Land. Thus "the angels of God ascending" in  refers to those who had escorted Jacob in the Land of Israel (who were then returning to heaven) while "descending" refers to those who were to escort him outside of the Land.

A Tanna taught that the angels ascended to look at the sight of Jacob above and descended to look at the sight below, and they wished to hurt him, and thus immediately (as  reports) "the Lord stood beside him." Rabbi Simeon ben Lakish said that were it not expressly stated in the Scripture, we would not dare to say it, but God is made to appear like a man who fans his son to protect him from the heat.

Rabbi Johanan taught that the wicked stand over their gods, as  says, "And Pharaoh dreamed, and, behold, he stood over the river." (The Egyptians worshiped the Nile as a god.) But God stands over them, as  says, "and, behold, the Lord stood over him." (Thus, idolaters must stand over and protect their idols, but God protects God's people.)

Rabbi Isaac deduced that God rolled up the whole Land of Israel and put it under Jacob, thus indicating that his descendants would easily conquer it.

Rabbi Judan said that Jacob declared that Isaac blessed him with five blessings, and God correspondingly appeared five times to Jacob and blessed him (and ). Rabbi Judan also said that Jacob wanted to thank God for permitting Jacob to see the fulfillment of those blessings. (And thus Jacob mentioned Isaac then on going down to witness Joseph's greatness.)

Jacob prayed, "And will keep me," and God assured Jacob, "And I will keep you." Jacob prayed, "In this way that I go," and God assured Jacob, "wherever you go." But the Rabbis taught that God did not answer Jacob's request for sustenance.

A person privileged to study the Torah is thus privileged to perform God's precepts. Moreover, converts' daughters could marry into the priesthood, so that their descendants could offer burnt-offerings on the altar. The Midrash offered another interpretation: bread refers to the showbread, while clothing refers to the priestly vestments. The Midrash offered yet another interpretation: bread refers to challah, while clothing refers to the first shearings of the sheep, both of which belong to the priests.

The Tosefta deduced from  that Jacob spoke as if God was not Jacob's God when Jacob was not in the land of Canaan.

Rabbi Ilai taught that the Sages ordained at Usha that if a person wishes to give charity liberally, the person should not give away more than a fifth of the person's wealth. Rav Nahman (or some say Rav Aha bar Jacob) cited  as proof for the proposition, as in the words "And of all that You shall give me, I will surely give a tenth to You," repetition of the verb to give a tenth or tithe implies two tenths or one fifth. The Gemara did the math and questioned whether the second tenth would not be less than the first tenth, as it would be taken from the nine-tenths that remained after the first tenth had been given away and thereby represented only 1/10 x 9/10 = 9/100 of the original capital. Rav Ashi replied that the words "I will . . . give a tenth of it" in  implied that he would make the second like the first.

The Pirke de Rabbi Eliezer taught that Jacob wished to ford the Jabbok and was detained there by an angel, who asked Jacob whether Jacob had not told God (in ), "Of all that you shall give me I will surely give a tenth to You." So Jacob gave a tenth of all the cattle that he had brought from Paddan-Aram. Jacob had brought some 5,500 animals, so his tithe came to 550 animals. Jacob again tried to ford the Jabbok, but was hindered again. The angel once again asked Jacob whether Jacob had not told God (in ), "Of all that you shall give me I will surely give a tenth to You." The angel noted that Jacob had sons and that Jacob had not given a tithe of them. So Jacob set aside the four firstborn sons (whom the law excluded from the tithe) of each of the four mothers, and eight sons remained. He began to count from Simeon, and included Benjamin, and continued the count from the beginning. And so Levi was reckoned as the tenth son, and thus the tithe, holy to God, as  says, "The tenth shall be holy to the Lord." So the angel Michael descended and took Levi and brought him up before the Throne of Glory and told God that Levi was God's lot. And God blessed him, that the sons of Levi should minister on earth before God (as directed in ) like the ministering angels in heaven.

Genesis chapter 29

So Rav Ashi replied that wa-yehi sometimes presages misfortune, and sometimes it does not, but the expression "and it came to pass in the days of" always presages misfortune.

The Gemara read  to employ the euphemistic expression "not clean," instead of the brief, but disparaging expression "unclean," so as not to speak disparagingly of unclean animals.

The Gemara taught that in reward for Rachel's modesty as shown in her dealings with Jacob, God rewarded her with King Saul as a descendant. The Gemara taught that Jacob asked Rachel, "Will you marry me?" She replied, "Yes, but my father is a trickster, and he will outwit you." Jacob replied, "I am his brother in trickery." She said to him, "Is it permitted to the righteous to indulge in trickery?" He replied, "Yes, with the pure you show yourself pure, and with the crooked you show yourself subtle." He asked her, "What is his trickery?" She replied: "I have a sister older than I am, and he will not let me marry before her." So Jacob gave her certain tokens through which he could identify her. When night came, she said to herself, "Now my sister will be put to shame," so she gave Leah the tokens. Thus when  reports, "And it came to pass in the morning that, behold, it was Leah," we are not to infer that up until then she had not been Leah, but rather that on account of the tokens that Rachel had given Leah, Jacob did not know until then that it was Leah. Therefore, God rewarded Rachel with having Saul among her descendants.

Rabbi Haggai said in Rabbi Isaac's name that all of the Matriarchs were prophets.

Rabbi Helbo quoted Rabbi Jonathan to teach that the firstborn should have come from Rachel, as  says, "These are the generations of Jacob, Joseph," but Leah prayed for mercy before Rachel did. On account of Rachel's modesty, however, God restored the rights of the firstborn to Rachel's son Joseph from Leah's son Reuben. To teach what caused Leah to anticipate Rachel with her prayer for mercy, Rav taught that Leah's eyes were sore (as  reports) from her crying about what she heard at the crossroads. There she heard people saying: "Rebecca has two sons, and Laban has two daughters; the elder daughter should marry the elder son, and the younger daughter should marry the younger son." Leah inquired about the elder son, and the people said that he was a wicked man, a highway robber. And Leah asked about the younger son, and the people said that he was "a quiet man dwelling in tents." So she cried about her fate until her eyelashes fell out.

The Pesikta de-Rav Kahana taught that Leah and Rachel were two of seven barren women about whom  says (speaking of God), "He . . . makes the barren woman to dwell in her house as a joyful mother of children." The Pesikta de-Rav Kahana also listed Sarah, Rebekah, Manoah's wife, Hannah, and Zion.

Rabbi Elazar taught that when in  Leah named her son Reuben, she said prophetically: "See (re'u) the difference between my son (ben) and Isaac's son Esau. Even though Esau knowingly sold his birthright to his brother Jacob, as  says, "And he sold his birthright to Jacob,"  nonetheless reports, "Esau hated Jacob." But even though Joseph took Reuben's birthright (as  reports), Reuben was not jealous of Joseph, and when Joseph's brothers sought to kill Joseph,  reports, "Reuben heard and he saved him from their hands, saying 'Let us not take his life.'"

Rabbi Johanan said in the name of Rabbi Shimon ben Yochai that  showed that from the day that God created the world, no man praised God until Leah did upon the birth of Judah.

Genesis chapter 30
It was taught in a Baraita that four types of people are accounted as though they were dead: a poor person, a person affected by skin disease (metzora), a blind person, and one who is childless. A poor person is accounted as dead, for  says, "for all the men are dead who sought your life" (and the Gemara interpreted this to mean that they had been stricken with poverty). A person affected by skin disease is accounted as dead, for  says, "And Aaron looked upon Miriam, and behold, she was leprous. And Aaron said to Moses . . . let her not be as one dead." The blind are accounted as dead, for  says, "He has set me in dark places, as they that be dead of old."

Rabbi Simeon taught that because Rachel treated the righteous Jacob so slightingly (as to trade away sleeping with him for some mandrakes, as reported in ) she was not buried with him. Thus in  Rachel said (in unwitting prophecy) "Therefore, he [Jacob] shall lie with you [Leah]," hinting that Jacob would lie with Leah in death, and not with Rachel. Rabbi Berekiah taught that Rabbi Eleazar and Rabbi Samuel ben Nahman commented on this. Rabbi Eleazar said that each wife lost (by the transaction) and each gained. Leah lost the mandrakes and gained the tribes (of Issachar and Zebulun) while Rachel gained the mandrakes and lost the tribes (of Issachar and Zebulun). (And some say Leah lost the birthright and Rachel gained the birthright. The birthright belonged to Reuben, but as a punishment for Reuben's causing this transaction, the birthright was taken from him and given to Joseph.) Rabbi Samuel ben Nahman said that Leah lost mandrakes and gained (two) tribes and the privilege of burial with Jacob, while Rachel gained mandrakes and lost the tribes and burial with Jacob.

For with regard to the generation of Moses,  says, "Take wise men, and understanding and known among your tribes, and I will make them rulers over you." But  says, "So I took the chiefs of your tribes, wise men and known," without mentioning "understanding" (implying that Moses could not find men with understanding). And  says, "Issachar is a large-boned donkey" (alluding to the Midrash that Leah heard Jacob's donkey, and so came out of her tent to summon Jacob to his marital duty, as reported in ). And 1 Chronicles  says, "of the children of Issachar . . . were men who had understanding of the times to know what Israel ought to do." But the Gemara limited the teaching of Rabbi Samuel bar Nahmani in the name of Rabbi Jonathan by counseling that such behavior is virtuous only when the wife ingratiates herself to her husband without making brazen demands.

Rabbi Johanan found in the words "Issachar is a large-boned donkey" in  an indication that Jacob's donkey detoured to Leah's tent, helping to cause Issachar's birth.

And Rav taught that the word "afterward" in  signified that Leah bore Dinah "after" she passed judgment on herself, reasoning that twelve tribes were destined to issue from Jacob and six had already issued from her and four from the handmaids, and if the child of the current pregnancy were to be a boy, then Rachel would not have as many sons as one of the handmaids. Thereupon the child was turned into a girl, and Dinah was born.

A Baraita taught that on Rosh Hashanah, God remembered each of Sarah, Rachel, and Hannah and decreed that they would bear children.

Rabbi Judan said in Rabbi Aibu's name that Rachel was remembered through many prayers. "And God hearkened to her" for Jacob's sake; "and opened her womb" for the sake of the matriarchs.

A Midrash taught that when  says, "And God remembered Rachel," it reports that God remember in her favor her silence on her sister Leah's behalf, for when Leah was being given to Jacob, Rachel knew it, yet was silent. For the Gemara taught (as recounted at greater length above) that when Jacob asked Rachel to marry him, Jacob entrusted Rachel with certain signs by which he might know her in the dark. While Leah was being led into the bridal chamber, Rachel realized that Leah would be disgraced, so Rachel gave Leah the signs. And thus because of what Rachel did, Jacob did not know that it was Leah until the morning.

A Midrash taught that it was only just that "God remembered Rachel," because Rachel had allowed her rival Bilhah into her home. Rav Huna and Rabbi Aha in Rabbi Simon's name quoted  "Dan, Joseph, and Benjamin," and taught that for the sake of Dan, Rachel was remembered; for the sake of Dan, Joseph and Benjamin were born (as a reward for Rachel's giving her rival Bilhah to Jacob, from whom was born Dan).

Rabbi Johanan taught that God holds three keys that God does not entrust to any messenger: the key of rain, the key of childbirth, and the key of the revival of the dead. The Gemara cited  to support the proposition that God holds the key of childbirth, as the verse says, "And God remembered Rachel, and God hearkened to her, and opened her womb."

Rabbi Judah ben Pazi said in the name of the academy of Rabbi Yannai that Rachel showed that she was a prophetess when in  she prophesied that she would bear another son, and by using the singular "son" she foretold that Jacob would have just one more son.

Rabbi Samuel bar Nahmani, citing Rabbi Johanan, noted that 1 Chronicles  reports that "the children of Issachar . . . had understanding." Rabbi Samuel bar Nahmani concluded that a woman who solicits her husband to perform the marital obligation, as Leah did, will have children the like of whom did not exist even in the generation of Moses.

The Tosefta deduced from  that before Jacob arrived, Laban's house had not received a blessing, and deduced from  that it was because of Jacob's arrival that Laban was blessed thereafter.

Genesis chapter 31
It was taught in a Baraita that Rabbi Akiva said that one of three things that he liked about the Medes was that when they held counsel, they did so only in the field. Rav Adda bar Ahabah said that , where Jacob called Rachel and Leah to the field, could be cited in support of the practice.

In , the heart can be stolen. A Midrash catalogued the wide range of additional capabilities of the heart reported in the Hebrew Bible. The heart speaks, sees, hears, walks, falls, stands, rejoices, cries, is comforted, is troubled, becomes hardened, grows faint, grieves, fears, can be broken, becomes proud, rebels, invents, cavils, overflows, devises, desires, goes astray, lusts, is refreshed, is humbled, is enticed, errs, trembles, is awakened, loves, hates, envies, is searched, is rent, meditates, is like a fire, is like a stone, turns in repentance, becomes hot, dies, melts, takes in words, is susceptible to fear, gives thanks, covets, becomes hard, makes merry, acts deceitfully, speaks from out of itself, loves bribes, writes words, plans, receives commandments, acts with pride, makes arrangements, and aggrandizes itself.

The Rabbis taught that God thus appeared more openly to the prophets of Israel than to those of other nations. The Rabbis compared God's action to those of a king who has both a wife and a concubine; to his wife he goes openly, but to his concubine he goes stealthily.

Similarly, a Midrash cited  as an application of the principle that all miracles that God did for Israel, and the punishment of the wicked on their behalf, took place at night.

God appears to nations other that Israel only as one who comes from a distance, as  says, "They came from a far country to me." But in connection with the prophets of Israel,  says, "And the Lord appeared," and  says, "And the Lord called," implying from the immediate vicinity. Rabbi Haninah compared the difference between the prophets of Israel and the prophets of other nations to a king who was with his friend in a chamber (separated by a curtain). Whenever the king desired to speak to his friend, he folded up the curtain and spoke to him. (But God speaks to the prophets of other nations without folding back the curtain.) The Rabbis compared it to a king who has a wife and a concubine; to his wife he goes openly, but to his concubine he repairs with stealth. Similarly, God appears to non-Jews only at night, as  says, "And God came to Balaam at night," and  says, "And God came to Laban the Aramean in a dream of the night."

The Pirke De-Rabbi Eliezer taught that Laban took all the men of his city, mighty men, and pursued after Jacob, seeking to slay him. Then the angel Michael descended, and drew his sword behind Laban, seeking to slay him. Michael told Laban (as reported in ): "Do not speak to Jacob, either good or bad."

Rabbi Johanan taught in the name of Rabbi Simeon ben Yohai that all the favors that the wicked do for the righteous are in fact evil for the righteous. Rabbi Johanan observed that one can understand why God would direct Laban not to speak evil to Jacob, but asked why God would direct him not to say anything good. From here Rabbi Johanan inferred that even if Laban had tried to speak good to Jacob, it would have resulted in bad for Jacob.

The Midrash thus taught that Jacob's words were (in the words of Ecclesiastes ) "like an error that proceeds from a ruler."

Rabbi Berekiah in Rabbi Levi's name read  to say, "The blessing of the destroyer came upon me," and interpreted "The blessing of the destroyer" to allude to Laban the Syrian. Rabbi Berekiah in Rabbi Levi's name thus read  to say, "An Aramean (Laban) sought to destroy my father (Jacob)." Rabbi Berekiah and Rabbi Levi in the name of Rabbi Hama ben Haninah thus explained that Rebekah was remembered with the blessing of children only after Isaac prayed for her, so that the heathens in Rebekah's family might not say that their prayer in  caused that result. Rather, God answered Isaac's prayer, as  reports, "And Isaac entreated the Lord for his wife . . . and his wife Rebekah conceived."

The Gemara read "if you shall afflict" to mean by denying conjugal duty, and the Gemara read "if you shall take" to refer to marrying rival wives. Thus the Gemara deduced that abstention from marital intercourse is considered an affliction.

Genesis chapter 32
Rav taught that Jacob's merit saved later Israelites.  reports that after King David ordered a census of the Israelites, God punished the Israelites with a plague.  then reports, "And as He was about to destroy, the Lord beheld, and He repented Him." The Gemara asked what God beheld that caused God to withhold destruction. Rav taught that God beheld (the merit of) Jacob, as  says, "And Jacob said when he beheld them (the angels that would protect Israel): 'This is God's camp.'"

In modern interpretation
The parashah is discussed in these modern sources:

Genesis chapters 25–33
Hermann Gunkel wrote that 
the legend cycle of Jacob-Esau-Laban divided clearly into the legends (1) of Jacob and Esau, (2) of Jacob and Laban, (3) of the origin of the twelve tribes, and (4) of the origin of ritual observances (22–32).

Walter Brueggemann suggested a chiastic structure to the Jacob narrative (shown in the chart below), moving from conflict with Esau to reconciliation with Esau. Within that is conflict with Laban moving to covenant with Laban. And within that, at the center, is the narrative of births, in which the birth of Joseph (at ) marks the turning point in the entire narrative, after which Jacob looks toward the Land of Israel and his brother Esau. In the midst of the conflicts are the two major encounters with God, which occur at crucial times in the sequence of conflicts.

Fretheim concluded that these four instances of Divine speaking link to each other in complex ways.

Israel Finkelstein and Neil Asher Silberman argue that the stories about Jacob and Laban metaphorically express the complex and stormy relations between the nations of Aram and Israel over many centuries.

Cynthia Chapman suggested that Judeans compiled and edited the ancestor narratives in Genesis after the Babylonian captivity to serve as stories of national origin. Chapman noted that several recurring themes of the Patriarchal narratives spoke to the exilic reality of those who preserved the stories. These stories emphasize God's presence and power transcending national boundaries, the special covenant between God and Abraham's descendants, the eternal nature of their covenant relationship, and the everlasting gift of the Promised Land. The stories also acknowledge tensions that threaten the protagonists. Jacob spent most of his adult life in Mesopotamia, and stories of hard-won children who were born into a land inheritance spoke powerfully to an exilic community that had lost many children to war and sickness during the long journey to exile. The Israelites viewed their world as a family tree; the story of Jacob's family became the basis for how the Israelites understood themselves socially and politically as an alliance of 12 tribes; and where tribes stood in relation to each other. The process by which Jacob became Israel involved fleeing, exile, and hard labor. From the perspective of a people exiled from their land living in Mesopotamia, Jacob's story was a powerful story of redemption. The Tribe of Judah also endured hard labor, took wives and had children, replenishing themselves into something resembling a nation. Many would build wealth in exile, and when they returned during the Persian period, they returned not as Judah, but as Israel, renamed before they crossed the Jordan River back into the Promised Land.

Genesis chapter 28
Ephraim Speiser saw in  two accounts about Jacob's first stay at Bethel that were blended into a single sequence.  and 17 use the Divine name Elohim, while  and 16 use the Tetragrammaton. Speiser argued that taken as a unit, the fused version is repetitious, but separately, each strand represents an independent tradition. Speiser thus cited  as an instance when the Tetragrammaton and Elohim occur in otherwise duplicate narratives, and the presence of the Priestly source is ruled out on other grounds, evincing the probability that the passages with Elohim point to a source that is neither the Jahwist nor the Priestly source, and thus evidently the Elohist.

Brueggemann identified three parts to the promise: (1) "I am with you." In a central thrust of Biblical faith, God commits to accompany the empty-handed fugitive in places of threat. (2) "I will keep you." Like a shepherd, the Keeper of Israel guarantees the lives of those who are exposed and defenseless. (3) The promise of homecoming. Brueggemann argued that  makes clear that God does watch over God's promise and bring it to fulfillment.

Kselman argued that in designating Bethel as the site for one of the Northern temples, the new Northern Kingdom reached back before the "innovation" of Solomon's Temple in Jerusalem to a site sacred to the ancestors.

Sandra Gravett, Karla Bohmbach, Franz Greifenhagen, and Donald Polaski reported that some scholars suggested that a scribe copying an earlier text may have added , "And he called the name of that place Beth-el, but the name of the city was Luz at the first," seeking to explain the location and history of the site.

Genesis chapter 29
Nahum Sarna reported that modern scholars deduce from the Genesis listings of Jacob's sons the evolution of the league of Israelite tribes. These scholars deduce from the listing of Reuben, Simeon, Levi, and Judah as Leah tribes that they were politically related. As their tribal territories were not contiguous, their organizing principle could not have been geographical, and their association must therefore reflect a presettlement reality. These scholars conclude that the six Leah tribes must have originated as a separate fraternity in Mesopotamia that evolved in two distinct stages. The account of the birth of Jacob's sons in  preserves the earliest traditions. The handmaid tribes had a subordinate status. And the tribe of Benjamin was the last to join the Israelite league and came into being in Canaan.

Genesis chapter 32

Commandments
According to Maimonides and Sefer ha-Chinuch, there are no commandments in the parashah.

The Kitzur Shulchan Aruch taught that on Tisha B'Av, people should make themselves uncomfortable when they go to bed at night. If they are used to sleeping with two pillows, on Tisha B'Av, they should sleep on one. The Kitzur Shulchan Aruch reported that some thus have the custom on the night of Tisha B'Av of sleeping on the ground with a stone under their head as a reminder of what  says of Jacob: "He took from the stones of the place." The Kitzur Shulchan Aruch told that on that night, Jacob had a vision of the destruction of the Temple and said (in the words of ), "How awesome is this place."

The Kitzur Shulchan Aruch taught that it is forbidden to hold two weddings for two siblings on the same day, because one should not mix one celebration with another celebration. And the Kitzur Shulchan Aruch reported that some authorities taught that one should not hold two weddings for two siblings in the same week, because , speaks of Jacob fulfilling "the week" of the newlywed Leah before marrying her sister Rachel.

Therefore, workers are not allowed to work at night and then hire themselves out during the day, because they will already be weak from their night work. Similarly, the Kitzur Shulchan Aruch taught that one is not allowed to work one's animal by night and then hire it out during the day. And workers are not allowed to starve or stint themselves, because this weakens their strength so that they will not be able to do their work properly.

In the liturgy

The doubling of the Hebrew word  to express intense longing in  also appears in the 16th-century Safed Rabbi Eliezer Azikri's kabbalistic poem "" ("Soul's Beloved") which many congregations chant just before the Kabbalat Shabbat prayer service.

Many Jews recite  three times as part of the Tefilat HaDerech (Wayfarer's Prayer) before setting out on a journey.

The Weekly Maqam
In the Weekly Maqam, Sephardi Jews each week base the songs of the services on the content of that week's parashah. For Parashah Vayetze, Sephardi Jews apply Maqam Ajam, the maqam that expresses happiness, commemorating the joy and happiness of the weddings of Jacob to Leah and Rachel.

Haftarah
A haftarah is a text selected from the books of Nevi'im ("The Prophets") that is read publicly in the synagogue after the reading of the Torah on Sabbath and holiday mornings. The haftarah usually has a thematic link to the Torah reading that precedes it. 

The specific text read following Parashah Vayetze varies according to different traditions within Judaism. Examples are: 

for Ashkenazi Jews: 
for Sephardi Jews: 
for Karaite Jews:

Notes

Further reading
The parashah has parallels or is discussed in these sources:

Biblical
 (courtship at the well);  (improvident oath).
 (courtship at the well);  (domestic animals lost to wild animals).
 (improvident oath).

Classical rabbinic
Tosefta: Sotah 10:7–8; Avodah Zarah 4:5. Land of Israel, circa 300 C.E. In, e.g., The Tosefta: Translated from the Hebrew, with a New Introduction. Translated by Jacob Neusner, volume 1, page 876–77; volume 2, page 1275. Peabody, Massachusetts: Hendrickson Publishers, 2002.
Jerusalem Talmud: Berakhot 43a, 92a; Shabbat 10b, 106b; Taanit 10b; Moed Katan 7a; Yevamot 43b; Ketubot 38b; Nedarim 1a; Nazir 1a; Sotah 17a, 32a; Sanhedrin 18a, 62a; Avodah Zarah 18b. Tiberias, Land of Israel, circa 400 CE. In, e.g., Talmud Yerushalmi. Edited by Chaim Malinowitz, Yisroel Simcha Schorr, and Mordechai Marcus, volumes 1–2, 13, 15, 25, 28, 30–31, 33–34, 36–37, 44–45, 48. Brooklyn: Mesorah Publications, 2005–2020. And in, e.g., The Jerusalem Talmud: A Translation and Commentary. Edited by Jacob Neusner and translated by Jacob Neusner, Tzvee Zahavy, B. Barry Levy, and Edward Goldman. Peabody, Massachusetts: Hendrickson Publishers, 2009.

Genesis Rabbah 44:8; 52:5; 67:9, 13; 68:1–74:17; 94:5. Land of Israel, 5th Century. In, e.g., Midrash Rabbah: Genesis. Translated by Harry Freedman and Maurice Simon. London: Soncino Press, 1939.
Babylonian Talmud: Berakhot 4a, 7b, 8b, 26b, 42a, 60a, 62b; Shabbat 80b, 115b; Eruvin 100b; Yoma 38b, 74b, 77a–b; Sukkah 53a; Rosh Hashanah 11a; Taanit 2a–b, 8b; Megillah 9a, 10b, 13a–b, 17a; Moed Katan 7b, 15a, 21b; Yevamot 26b–27a, 28b, 62b, 97b, 103b; Ketubot 7b, 47b, 50a, 91b; Nedarim 20b, 64b; Nazir 23b, 50a; Bava Kamma 65b; Bava Metzia 93b; Bava Batra 123a–b; Sanhedrin 29a, 39b, 98b; Makkot 19b; Avodah Zarah 3a, 5a, 9a, 24b; Menachot 63a; Chullin 18b, 91b; Bekhorot 45a; Niddah 31a–b. Sasanian Empire, 6th Century. In, e.g., Talmud Bavli. Edited by Yisroel Simcha Schorr, Chaim Malinowitz, and Mordechai Marcus, 72 volumes. Brooklyn: Mesorah Pubs., 2006.

Medieval
Rashi. Commentary. Genesis 28–32. Troyes, France, late 11th Century. In, e.g., Rashi. The Torah: With Rashi's Commentary Translated, Annotated, and Elucidated. Translated and annotated by Yisrael Isser Zvi Herczeg, volume 1, pages 309–57. Brooklyn: Mesorah Publications, 1995.
Rashbam. Commentary on the Torah. Troyes, early 12th century. In, e.g., Rabbi Samuel Ben Meir's Commentary on Genesis: An Annotated Translation. Translated by Martin I. Lockshin, pages 162–97. Lewiston, New York: The Edwin Mellen Press, 1989.

Judah Halevi. Kuzari. 2:14, 50, 80. Toledo, Spain, 1130–1140. In, e.g., Jehuda Halevi. Kuzari: An Argument for the Faith of Israel. Introduction by Henry Slonimsky, pages 91, 114, 133. New York: Schocken, 1964.
Abraham ibn Ezra. Commentary on the Torah. Mid-12th century. In, e.g., Ibn Ezra's Commentary on the Pentateuch: Genesis (Bereshit). Translated and annotated by H. Norman Strickman and Arthur M. Silver, pages 275–310. New York: Menorah Publishing Company, 1988.
Hezekiah ben Manoah. Hizkuni. France, circa 1240. In, e.g., Chizkiyahu ben Manoach. Chizkuni: Torah Commentary. Translated and annotated by Eliyahu Munk, volume 1, pages 215–41. Jerusalem: Ktav Publishers, 2013.
Nachmanides. Commentary on the Torah. Jerusalem, circa 1270. In, e.g., Ramban (Nachmanides): Commentary on the Torah: Genesis. Translated by Charles B. Chavel, volume 1, pages 349–93. New York: Shilo Publishing House, 1971.

Midrash ha-Ne'lam (The Midrash of the Concealed). Spain, 13th century. In Zohar Chadash, pages 27b–28d. Salonika, 1587. In, e.g., The Zohar: Pritzker Edition. Translation and commentary by Nathan Wolski, volume 10, pages 425–47. Stanford, California: Stanford University Press, 2016.
Zohar 1:146b–65b. Spain, late 13th Century. In, e.g., The Zohar. Translated by Harry Sperling and Maurice Simon. 5 volumes. London: Soncino Press, 1934.
Nissim of Gerona (The Ran). Derashos HaRan (Discourses of the Ran), discourse 5. Barcelona, Catalonia, 14th century. In, e.g., Yehuda Meir Keilson. Derashos HaRan: Discourses of the Ran, Rabbeinu Nissim ben Reuven of Gerona, Translated, Annotated, and Elucidated. Volume 1, pages 365–464. Brooklyn: Mesorah Publications, 2019.
Isaac ben Moses Arama. Akedat Yizhak (The Binding of Isaac). Late 15th century. In, e.g., Yitzchak Arama. Akeydat Yitzchak: Commentary of Rabbi Yitzchak Arama on the Torah. Translated and condensed by Eliyahu Munk, volume 1, pages 196–209. New York, Lambda Publishers, 2001.

Modern

Isaac Abravanel. Commentary on the Torah. Italy, between 1492 and 1509. In, e.g., Abarbanel: Selected Commentaries on the Torah: Volume 1: Bereishis/Genesis. Translated and annotated by Israel Lazar, pages 185–209. Brooklyn: CreateSpace, 2015.
Obadiah ben Jacob Sforno. Commentary on the Torah. Venice, 1567. In, e.g., Sforno: Commentary on the Torah. Translation and explanatory notes by Raphael Pelcovitz, pages 148–73. Brooklyn: Mesorah Publications, 1997.
Moshe Alshich. Commentary on the Torah. Safed, circa 1593. In, e.g., Moshe Alshich. Midrash of Rabbi Moshe Alshich on the Torah. Translated and annotated by Eliyahu Munk, volume 1, pages 183–207. New York, Lambda Publishers, 2000.
Saul Levi Morteira. "The Dust of the Earth." Budapest, circa 1623. In Marc Saperstein. Exile in Amsterdam: Saul Levi Morteira’s Sermons to a Congregation of "New Jews," pages 377–92. Cincinnati: Hebrew Union College Press, 2005.

John Donne. "Song: Go and catch a falling star." England, early 17th century. ("Get with child a mandrake root").
Avraham Yehoshua Heschel. Commentaries on the Torah. Cracow, Poland, mid 17th century. Compiled as Chanukat HaTorah. Edited by Chanoch Henoch Erzohn. Piotrkow, Poland, 1900. In Avraham Yehoshua Heschel. Chanukas HaTorah: Mystical Insights of Rav Avraham Yehoshua Heschel on Chumash. Translated by Avraham Peretz Friedman, pages 78–80. Southfield, Michigan: Targum Press/Feldheim Publishers, 2004.

Thomas Hobbes. Leviathan, 3:34, 36; 4:45. England, 1651. Reprint edited by C. B. Macpherson, pages 437, 460, 676–77. Harmondsworth, England: Penguin Classics, 1982.
Moshe Chaim Luzzatto Mesillat Yesharim, chapter 4. Amsterdam, 1740. In Mesillat Yesharim: The Path of the Just, page 53. Jerusalem: Feldheim, 1966.

Chaim ibn Attar. Ohr ha-Chaim. Venice, 1742. In Chayim ben Attar. Or Hachayim: Commentary on the Torah. Translated by Eliyahu Munk, volume 1, pages 234–72. Brooklyn: Lambda Publishers, 1999.
George Eliot. Adam Bede, chapters 3, 21. Edinburgh and London: William Blackwood and Sons, 1859. Reprinted, e.g., edited by Carol A. Martin, pages 31, 220. Oxford: Oxford University Press, 2008. (Seth tells Dinah, "It’s a deep mystery—the way the heart of man turns to one woman out of all the rest he’s seen i’ the world, and makes it easier for him to work seven year for her, like Jacob did for Rachel, sooner than have any other woman for th’ asking. I often think of them words [in ], ‘And Jacob served seven years for Rachel; and they seemed to him but a few days for the love he had to her.’" Separately, Miss Liddy works on a needlepoint of "Jacob and Rachel a-kissing one another among the sheep," as reported in ).
"Jacob’s Ladder." In Greensbury Washington Offley. A Narrative of the Life and Labors of the Rev. G.W. Offley, a Colored Man, Local Preacher and Missionary, pages 23–24. Hartford, 1859. (a hymn).

Samuel David Luzzatto (Shadal). Commentary on the Torah. Padua, 1871. In, e.g., Samuel David Luzzatto. Torah Commentary. Translated and annotated by Eliyahu Munk, volume 1, pages 272–309. New York: Lambda Publishers, 2012.
Yehudah Aryeh Leib Alter. Sefat Emet. Góra Kalwaria (Ger), Poland, before 1906. Excerpted in The Language of Truth: The Torah Commentary of Sefat Emet. Translated and interpreted by Arthur Green, pages 43–48. Philadelphia: Jewish Publication Society, 1998. Reprinted 2012.

Abraham Isaac Kook. The Moral Principles. Early 20th Century. In Abraham Isaac Kook: the Lights of Penitence, the Moral Principles, Lights of Holiness, Essays, Letters, and Poems. Translated by Ben Zion Bokser, page 162. Mahwah, New Jersey: Paulist Press 1978.
Rufus Town Stephenson. "The Jacob's Ladder in Homer." The Classical Journal, volume 30 (number 9) (June 1935): pages 515–30.
Alexander Alan Steinbach. Sabbath Queen: Fifty-four Bible Talks to the Young Based on Each Portion of the Pentateuch, pages 20–22. New York: Behrman's Jewish Book House, 1936.
Millar Burrows. "The Complaint of Laban's Daughters." Journal of the American Oriental Society, volume 57 (1937): pages 259–76.
Cyrus H. Gordon. "The Story of Jacob and Laban in the Light of the Nuzi Tablets." Bulletin of the American Schools of Oriental Research, volume 66 (1937): pages 25–27.

Irving Fineman. Jacob, An Autobiographical Novel. New York: Random House, 1941.
Thomas Mann. Joseph and His Brothers. Translated by John E. Woods, pages 24–25, 37, 47, 51, 87, 103–12, 119–20, 124–25, 135, 138, 142, 173–305, 307, 313, 323, 334, 337, 384–86, 388–92, 425, 460, 474, 488, 491–93, 502–03, 511, 515, 517, 519, 524, 530, 669–70, 676–77, 690–91, 693, 715–16, 729–30, 778, 805, 814, 883, 915. New York: Alfred A. Knopf, 2005. Originally published as Joseph und seine Brüder. Stockholm: Bermann-Fischer Verlag, 1943.

Bernard Malamud. "The Literary Life of Laban Goldman." Assembly (November 1943). In Bernard Malamud. The People and Uncollected Stories. New York: Farrar, Straus and Giroux, 1989. And reprinted in Bernard Malamud. The Complete Stories. New York: Farrar, Straus and Giroux, 1997. (a character named Laban seeks to change marriage conventions, deceives others and himself).
Bernard Malamud. "The First Seven Years." Partisan Review (September–October 1950). In Bernard Malamud. The Magic Barrel. New York: Farrar, Straus and Giroux, 1958. And reprinted in Bernard Malamud. A Malamud Reader. New York: Farrar, Straus and Giroux, 1967. And reprinted in Bernard Malamud. The Stories of Bernard Malamud. New York: Farrar, Straus and Giroux, 1983. And reprinted in Bernard Malamud. The Complete Stories. New York: Farrar, Straus and Giroux, 1997. (a refugee works for seven years to win the hand of his employer's daughter).
Charles Reznikoff. Luzzato: Padua 1727. Mid 20th Century. In Harold Bloom. American Religious Poems, page 247. Library of America, 2006.
Peter R. Ackroyd. "The Teraphim." Expository Times, volume 62 (1950–51): pages 378–80.
M. David. "Zabal (Gen. Xxx 26)." Vetus Testamentum, volume 1 (1951): pages 59–60.
David Daube and Reuven Yaron. "Jacob's Reception by Laban." Journal of Semitic Studies, volume 1 (1956): pages 60–62.
Moshe Greenberg. "Another Look at Rachel's Theft of the Teraphim." Journal of Biblical Literature, volume 81 (1962): pages 239–48.
Walter Orenstein and Hertz Frankel. Torah and Tradition: A Bible Textbook for Jewish Youth: Volume I: Bereishis, pages 72–82. New York: Hebrew Publishing Company, 1964.
John G. Griffiths. "The Celestial Ladder and the Gate of Heaven (Genesis 28:12,17)." Expository Times, volume 76 (1964–65): page 229.
Frederick Buechner. The Magnificent Defeat, pages 10–18. Seabury Press, 1966. Reprinted San Francisco: Harper & Row, 1985.
Francisco O. Garcia-Treto. "Genesis 31:44 and ‘Gilead.'" Zeitschrift für die Alttestamentliche Wissenschaft, volume 79 (1967): pages 13–17.
Delmore Schwartz. "Jacob." In Selected Poems: Summer Knowledge, pages 233–35. New York: New Directions, 1967.
Jacob J. Finkelstein. "An Old Babylonian Herding Contract and Genesis 31:38." Journal of the American Oriental Society, volume 88 (1968): pages 30–36.
Francis I. Andersen. "Note on Genesis 30:8." Journal of Biblical Literature, volume 88 (1969): page 200.
Murray H. Lichtenstein. "Dream-Theophany and the E Document." Journal of the Ancient Near Eastern Society, volume 1 (number 2) (1969): pages 45–54.
Rintje Frankena. "Some Remarks on the Semitic Background of Chapters XXIX–XXXI of the Book of Genesis." Oudtestamentische Studiën, volume 17 (1972): pages 53–64.
Ernest G. Clarke. "Jacob's Dream at Bethel as Interpreted in the Targums and the New Testament." Studies in Religion/Sciences Religieuses, volume 4 (1974–75): pages 367–77.
Francisco O. Garcia-Treto. "Jacob's ‘Oath-Covenant' in Genesis 28." Trinity University Studies in Religion, volume 10 (1975): pages 1–10.
Seän M. Warner. "The Patriarchs and Extra-Biblical Sources." Journal for the Study of the Old Testament, volume 1, number 2 (June 1976): pages 50–61.
J. Maxwell Miller. "The Patriarchs and Extra-Biblical Sources: a Response." Journal for the Study of the Old Testament, volume 1, number 2 (June 1976): pages 62–66.
Cornelis Houtman. "What Did Jacob See in His Dream at Bethel? Some Remarks on Genesis xxviii 10–22." Vetus Testamentum, volume 27 (1977): pages 337–51.
Cornelis Houtman. "Jacob at Mahanaim. Some Remarks on Genesis xxxii 2–3." Vetus Testamentum, volume 28 (1978): pages 37–44.
Peter D. Miscall. "The Jacob and Joseph Stories as Analogies." Journal for the Study of the Old Testament, volume 3, number 6 (April 1978): pages 28–40.
Donald J. Wiseman. "They Lived in Tents." In Biblical and Near Eastern Studies: Essays in Honor of William Sanford La Sor. Edited by Gary A. Tuttle, pages 195–200. Grand Rapids: Eerdmans, 1978.
Michael Fishbane. "Genesis 25:19–35:22/The Jacob Cycle." In Text and Texture: Close Readings of Selected Biblical Texts, pages 40–62. New York: Schocken Books, 1979.
John G. Gammie. "Theological Interpretation by Way of Literary and Tradition Analysis: Genesis 25–36." In Encounter with the Text: Form and History in the Hebrew Bible. Edited by Martin J. Buss, pages 117–34. Philadelphia: Fortress, 1979.
Charles Mabee. "Jacob and Laban: The Structure of Judicial Proceedings: (Genesis XXXI 25–42)." Vetus Testamentum, volume 30 (1980): pages 192–207.
Nehama Leibowitz. Studies in Bereshit (Genesis), pages 298–344. Jerusalem: The World Zionist Organization, 1981. Reprinted as New Studies in the Weekly Parasha. Lambda Publishers, 2010.
Molly Tuby. "Jacob's Dream." European Judaism: A Journal for the New Europe, volume 15 (number 1) (Summer 1981): pages 13–16.
Nathaniel Wander. "Structure, Contradiction, and ‘Resolution' in Mythology: Father's Brother's Daughter Marriage and the Treatment of Women in Genesis 11–50." Journal of the Ancient Near Eastern Society, volume 13 (1981): pages 75–99.

Walter Brueggemann. Genesis: Interpretation: A Bible Commentary for Teaching and Preaching, pages 241–66. Atlanta: John Knox Press, 1982.
James A. Diamond. "The Deception of Jacob: A New Perspective on an Ancient Solution to the Problem." Vetus Testamentum, volume 34 (1984): pages 211–13.
Margaret Atwood. The Handmaid's Tale. Boston: Houghton Mifflin, 1986.

Walter Brueggemann. Genesis: Interpretation: A Bible Commentary for Teaching and Preaching, pages 204–12, 241–64. Atlanta: John Knox Press, 1986.
Pinchas H. Peli. Torah Today: A Renewed Encounter with Scripture, pages 29–32. Washington, D.C.: B'nai B'rith Books, 1987.
Louis H. Feldman. "Josephus' Portrait of Jacob." The Jewish Quarterly Review, New Series, volume 79 (number 2/3) (October 1988–January 1989): pages 101–51. 
Nahum M. Sarna. The JPS Torah Commentary: Genesis: The Traditional Hebrew Text with the New JPS Translation, pages 197–223, 398–403. Philadelphia: Jewish Publication Society, 1989.
Jeanne Steig and William Steig. "Jacob's Ladder." In The Old Testament Made Easy. New York: Farrar Straus Giroux, 1990.
Frederick Buechner. The Son of Laughter. New York: HarperCollins, 1993.
Lawrence Kushner. God Was in This Place and I, I Did Not Know: Finding Self, Spirituality and Ultimate Meaning. Jewish Lights Publishing, 1993.
Pat Schneider Welcoming Angels. In Long Way Home: Poems, page 90. Amherst, Massachusetts: Amherst Writers and Artists Press, 1993.
Aaron Wildavsky. Assimilation versus Separation: Joseph the Administrator and the Politics of Religion in Biblical Israel, pages 5–6, 8. New Brunswick, New Jersey: Transaction Publishers, 1993.
Judith S. Antonelli. "Rachel and Leah: Making Sisterhood Powerful." In In the Image of God: A Feminist Commentary on the Torah, pages 72–87. Northvale, New Jersey: Jason Aronson, 1995.
Naomi H. Rosenblatt and Joshua Horwitz. Wrestling With Angels: What Genesis Teaches Us About Our Spiritual Identity, Sexuality, and Personal Relationships, pages 259–88. Delacorte Press, 1995.
Avivah Gottlieb Zornberg. The Beginning of Desire: Reflections on Genesis, pages 180–215. New York: Image Books/Doubelday, 1995.

Ellen Frankel. The Five Books of Miriam: A Woman’s Commentary on the Torah, pages 49–63. New York: G. P. Putnam's Sons, 1996.
W. Gunther Plaut. The Haftarah Commentary, pages 64–73. New York: UAHC Press, 1996.
Beginning The Journey: Toward a Women's Commentary on Torah. Edited by Emily H. Feigenson, pages 1–59, 151–53. Women of Reform Judaism, The Federation of Temple Sisterhoods, 1997.
Sorel Goldberg Loeb and Barbara Binder Kadden. Teaching Torah: A Treasury of Insights and Activities, pages 46–51. Denver: A.R.E. Publishing, 1997.

Scott E. Noegel. "Sex, Sticks, and the Trickster in Gen. 30:31–43." Journal of the Ancient Near Eastern Society, volume 25 (1997): pages 7–17.
Celia de Fréine. "Jacob's Ladder." Poetry Ireland Review, number 57 (Summer 1998): pages 41–42.
Mary Doria Russell. Children of God: A Novel, page 427. New York: Villard, 1998. ("God was in this place, and I—I did not know it.").

Susan Freeman. Teaching Jewish Virtues: Sacred Sources and Arts Activities, pages 69–84, 228–40, 332–46. Springfield, New Jersey: A.R.E. Publishing, 1999. (13, 25).
Adin Steinsaltz. Simple Words: Thinking About What Really Matters in Life, page 199. New York: Simon & Schuster, 1999.
John S. Kselman. "Genesis." In The HarperCollins Bible Commentary. Edited by James L. Mays, pages 100–03. New York: HarperCollins Publishers, revised edition, 2000.
Tamara Goshen-Gottstein. "The Souls that They Made: Physical Infertility and Spiritual Fecundity." In Torah of the Mothers: Contemporary Jewish Women Read Classical Jewish Texts. Edited by Ora Wiskind Elper and Susan Handelman, pages 123–54. New York and Jerusalem: Urim Publications, 2000..

Israel Finkelstein and Neil Asher Silberman. "Searching for the Patriarchs." In The Bible Unearthed: Archaeology's New Vision of Ancient Israel and the Origin of Its Sacred Texts, pages 27–47. New York: The Free Press, 2001.
Lainie Blum Cogan and Judy Weiss. Teaching Haftarah: Background, Insights, and Strategies, pages 519–36. Denver: A.R.E. Publishing, 2002.
Michael Fishbane. The JPS Bible Commentary: Haftarot, pages 40–55. Philadelphia: Jewish Publication Society, 2002.
Alan Lew. This Is Real and You Are Completely Unprepared: The Days of Awe as a Journey of Transformation, pages 154–55. Boston: Little, Brown and Co., 2003.
Robert Alter. The Five Books of Moses: A Translation with Commentary, pages 149–77. New York: W.W. Norton & Co., 2004.
Jon D. Levenson. "Genesis." In The Jewish Study Bible. Edited by Adele Berlin and Marc Zvi Brettler, pages 58–66. New York: Oxford University Press, 2004.
Professors on the Parashah: Studies on the Weekly Torah Reading Edited by Leib Moscovitz, pages 56–59. Jerusalem: Urim Publications, 2005.
Frank Anthony Spina. "Esau: The Face of God." In The Faith of the Outsider: Exclusion and Inclusion in the Biblical Story, pages 14–34. William B. Eerdmans Publishing Company, 2005.

Jules Francis Gomes. The Sanctuary of Bethel and the Configuration of Israelite Identity. De Gruyter, 2006.
James L. Kugel. The Ladder of Jacob: Ancient Interpretations of the Biblical Story of Jacob and His Children. Princeton: Princeton University Press, 2006.
Denise Levertov. "The Jacob's Ladder" in Harold Bloom, American Religious Poems, page 379. Library of America, 2006.
W. Gunther Plaut. The Torah: A Modern Commentary: Revised Edition. Revised edition edited by David E.S. Stern, pages 194–217. New York: Union for Reform Judaism, 2006.
Suzanne A. Brody. "Leah's Lesson." In Dancing in the White Spaces: The Yearly Torah Cycle and More Poems, page 68. Shelbyville, Kentucky: Wasteland Press, 2007.
James L. Kugel. How To Read the Bible: A Guide to Scripture, Then and Now, pages 133–62, 170–71, 195, 353, 400, 521. New York: Free Press, 2007.
Esther Jungreis. Life Is a Test, pages 77–78, 130, 134, 163. Brooklyn: Shaar Press, 2007.
Sandra L. Gravett, Karla G. Bohmbach, F.V. Greifenhagen, Donald C. Polaski. An Introduction to the Hebrew Bible: A Thematic Approach, pages 53–58, 61–62, 68–70, 73. Louisville: Westminster John Knox, 2008.

The Torah: A Women's Commentary. Edited by Tamara Cohn Eskenazi and Andrea L. Weiss, pages 157–82. New York: URJ Press, 2008.
Jonathan Goldstein. "Jacob and Esau." In Ladies and Gentlemen, the Bible! pages 105–14. New York: Riverhead Books, 2009.
Reuven Hammer. Entering Torah: Prefaces to the Weekly Torah Portion, pages 41–46. New York: Gefen Publishing House, 2009.
Yoel Kahn. "And Jacob Came Out: Parashat Vayetzei (Genesis 28:10–32:3)." In Torah Queeries: Weekly Commentaries on the Hebrew Bible. Edited by Gregg Drinkwater, Joshua Lesser, and David Shneer; foreword by Judith Plaskow, pages 43–46. New York: New York University Press, 2009.

Timothy Keller. "Love Is Not All You Need" and "The End of Counterfeit Gods." In Counterfeit Gods: The Empty Promises of Money, Sex, and Power, and the Only Hope that Matters. Dutton Adult, 2009. (Jacob's love for Rachel; Jacob and Esau).
Jonathan Sacks. Covenant & Conversation: A Weekly Reading of the Jewish Bible: Genesis: The Book of Beginnings, pages 177–210. New Milford, Connecticut: Maggid Books, 2009.
John H. Walton. "Genesis." In Zondervan Illustrated Bible Backgrounds Commentary. Edited by John H. Walton, volume 1, pages 106–15. Grand Rapids, Michigan: Zondervan, 2009.
Raymond Westbrook. "Good as His Word: Jacob Manipulates Justice." Biblical Archaeology Review, volume 35 (number 3) (May/June 2009): pages 50–55, 64.

Calum Carmichael. The Book of Numbers: A Critique of Genesis, pages 1, 7–8, 20, 55, 73, 92, 99–100, 120–21, 126–30, 133–34, 136, 147–56, 159, 192. New Haven: Yale University Press, 2012.
Shmuel Herzfeld. "Yaakov's Synagogue: A Model for All of Us." In Fifty-Four Pick Up: Fifteen-Minute Inspirational Torah Lessons, pages 35–38. Jerusalem: Gefen Publishing House, 2012.
Chee-Chiew Lee. Journal for the Study of the Old Testament, volume 36 (number 3) (March 2012): pages 279–96..
William G. Dever. The Lives of Ordinary People in Ancient Israel: When Archaeology and the Bible Intersect, pages 46, 290. Grand Rapids, Michigan: William B. Eerdmans Publishing Company, 2012.
Jerry Rabow. The Lost Matriarch: Finding Leah in the Bible and Midrash. Philadelphia: Jewish Publication Society, 2014.
Jonathan Sacks. Lessons in Leadership: A Weekly Reading of the Jewish Bible, pages 31–34. New Milford, Connecticut: Maggid Books, 2015.
Jean-Pierre Isbouts. Archaeology of the Bible: The Greatest Discoveries From Genesis to the Roman Era, pages 62–66. Washington, D.C.: National Geographic, 2016.
Jonathan Sacks. Essays on Ethics: A Weekly Reading of the Jewish Bible, pages 41–45. New Milford, Connecticut: Maggid Books, 2016.
Shai Held. The Heart of Torah, Volume 1: Essays on the Weekly Torah Portion: Genesis and Exodus, pages 60–68. Philadelphia: Jewish Publication Society, 2017.
Steven Levy and Sarah Levy. The JPS Rashi Discussion Torah Commentary, pages 21–23. Philadelphia: Jewish Publication Society, 2017.
Jeffrey K. Salkin. The JPS B'nai Mitzvah Torah Commentary, pages 30–34. Philadelphia: Jewish Publication Society, 2017.
Pallant Ramsundar. "Biblical Mistranslations to 'Euphrates' and the Impact on the Borders of Israel." American Journal of Biblical Theology (2019).

Aren M. Wilson-Wright. "Bethel and the Persistence of El: Evidence for the Survival of El as an Independent Deity in the Jacob Cycle and 1 Kings 12:25–30." Journal of Biblical Literature, volume 138, number 4 (2019): pages 705–20.
Andrew Tobolowsky. "The Problem of Reubenite Primacy: New Paradigms, New Answers." Journal of Biblical Literature, volume 139, number 1 (2020): pages 27–45.
Liana Finck. Let There Be Light: The Real Story of Her Creation, pages 249–73. New York: Random House, 2022.

External links

Texts
Masoretic text and 1917 JPS translation
Hear the parashah chanted
Hear the parashah read in Hebrew

Commentaries

Academy for Jewish Religion, California
Academy for Jewish Religion, New York
Aish.com 
Akhlah: The Jewish Children's Learning Network 
Aleph Beta Academy
Alicia Jo Rabins
American Jewish University—Ziegler School of Rabbinic Studies
Anshe Emes Synagogue, Los Angeles 
Ari Goldwag
Ascent of Safed
Bar-Ilan University 
Chabad.org
eparsha.com
G-dcast
The Israel Koschitzky Virtual Beit Midrash
Jewish Agency for Israel
Jewish Theological Seminary
Mechon Hadar
Miriam Aflalo 
MyJewishLearning.com
Ohr Sameach
Orthodox Union
OzTorah—Torah from Australia
Oz Ve Shalom—Netivot Shalom
Pardes from Jerusalem
Professor James L. Kugel
Rabbi Dov Linzer
Rabbi Fabian Werbin
Rabbi Jonathan Sacks
RabbiShimon.com 
Rabbi Shlomo Riskin
Rabbi Shmuel Herzfeld
Rabbi Stan Levin
Reconstructionist Judaism 
Sephardic Institute
Shiur.com
613.org Jewish Torah Audio 
Suzanne A. Brody
Tanach Study Center
Teach613.org, Torah Education at Cherry Hill
TheTorah.com
Torah from Dixie 
Torah.org
TorahVort.com
Union for Reform Judaism
United Synagogue of Conservative Judaism 
What's Bothering Rashi?
Yeshivat Chovevei Torah
Yeshiva University

Weekly Torah readings in Kislev
Weekly Torah readings from Genesis